Hendrik Willem ten Cate (born 9 December 1954) is a Dutch football manager and former professional player.

In the 2005–06 season, he was assistant to Frank Rijkaard at Barcelona when the team won the UEFA Champions League and La Liga titles. He then served as manager of Ajax until October 2007 and won three trophies for the Dutch club.

Ten Cate joined Chelsea on 11 October 2007 as assistant manager but stepped down after the defeat of the 2008 UEFA Champions League Final on 29 May 2008 just 5 days after the departure of manager Avram Grant.

Playing career
Ten Cate started his football career at amateur side FC Rheden before signing his first professional contract at Go Ahead Eagles. He made his Eredivisie debut in the 1979–80 season and earned himself 27 appearances throughout the season in which he scored four goals. These performances earned him a transfer to NASL side Edmonton Drillers in Canada.

After the North American season he returned to Go Ahead Eagles and continued his Eredivisie campaign. He became however unsure of his position and was sent on loan to Eerste Divisie side Telstar where he was one of their key players. After the season at Telstar he returned to Deventer and became a first team regular for Go Ahead Eagles again for three more seasons. In 1985, he switched to SC Heracles where he ended his professional career as a player.

Managerial career
After his playing career Ten Cate became assistant manager of Fritz Korbach at Go Ahead Eagles, playing in the Eerste Divisie. When Korbach moved to SC Heerenveen in February 1990 Ten Cate took over as a manager. He managed to win period title, which earned an Eerste Divisie side a place in the promotion play-offs at the end of the season. In these play-offs Go Ahead Eagles placed equal with Korbach's SC Heerenveen, but Heerenveen promoted to the Eredivisie on goal difference.

Ten Cate left Go Ahead Eagles and returned to one of the other teams he was active at during his playing career, SC Heracles where he became the assistant of manager Henk van Brussel. When Van Brussel was unable to finish the season due to health problems in November 1990 Ten Cate became the first team manager and led SC Heracles until 1992, when he was told his contract would not be extended. He moved to the club where his football career started, amateur side FC Rheden and managed them for one year.

In 1993, Go Ahead Eagles appointed Ten Cate yet again as their manager, this time to replace Jan Versleijen who left the club to manage De Graafschap. In his first year, he did well, but when Go Ahead Eagles was at the bottom of the Eerste Divisie during the winter break of the 1994–95 season he was fired. Eredivisie side Sparta Rotterdam offered him a contract and he led the team to a sixth position in the Eredivisie in 1996, they also reached the final of the KNVB Cup that year, which was lost to PSV Eindhoven 5–2.

In the 1997–98 winter break Ten Cate switched to manage Vitesse Arnhem, which he led to their best Eredivisie ranking in their history, a third position with records in both the number of points won as the number of scored goals. After a disappointing start in the following season he left Vitesse and led KFC Uerdingen 05 until March 1999 without success. In the 1999–00 season he managed Hungarian side MTK Hungária FC to win the Hungarian Cup and a runners-up place in the PNB League. He returned to the Netherlands and became manager of NAC Breda which he led until 2003 earning them a spot in the UEFA Cup for the 2003–04 season.

In June 2003, Ajax gave him an offer as a manager, however, he decided to join Frank Rijkaard at FC Barcelona and became his assistant manager because Frank Rijkaard had the lack of experience as a top manager at that time. Thus, Frank Rijkaard believed that Ten Cate was able to compensate for his weak points as a manager. Rijkaard explained that "I was a motivator, Henk [ten Cate] was a strategist for the team". Indeed, Ten Cate was responsible for strategies and tactics of FC Barcelona during its training sessions. Together they managed Barça to a Champions League Trophy and two La Liga titles. In 2006, he replaced Danny Blind as a manager at Ajax, where he won the Johan Cruijff-schaal in 2006 and 2007 and the KNVB Cup in 2007. Ajax finished equal on points with PSV Eindhoven in the Eredivisie in 2006, only to be denied the championship by a single goal in goal difference.

Chelsea

In early October 2007, Ten Cate was strongly linked to taking over as assistant manager to Avram Grant at Chelsea because owner of the English club, Russian billionaire Roman Abramovich had a high opinion of Ten Cate as a great tactician. On 8 October 2007, Ajax announced on their website they had reached an agreement with Chelsea about Ten Cate's immediate transfer to the London side, noting also the deal was still to be finalized. Ten Cate officially joined Chelsea on 11 October 2007 as assistant first team coach.

Following the 2008 UEFA Champions League Final, Ten Cate expressed his disappointment with Didier Drogba for his sending-off (if Drogba had not been sent off, he would have taken the fifth penalty). Drogba's expulsion led to John Terry taking Chelsea's fifth penalty, which he failed to convert as he slipped on the rain-soaked turf. Had he scored, Chelsea would have secured their first Champions League Title.

Ten Cate was sacked from his role at Chelsea on 29 May 2008, two days after being told the sacking of Avram Grant would not affect his position.

Panathinaikos
On 13 June 2008, Ten Cate signed a two-year deal with a Greek Superleague team, Panathinaikos FC. Ten Cate gave the following statement on his appointment: "Panathinaikos' history, ambition and attitude towards football in general match those of the greatest football clubs in Europe. "I've been used to working at the highest level and that's why I consider this a great challenge."

Ten Cate's Panathinaikos managed to qualify for the last "16" Phase of UEFA Champions' League in the 2008–2009 season, where Panathinaikos were eliminated by Villarreal CF. However, they won the Europe Cup Play Offs, winning the second seed for the next year's Champions League Playoffs. In his first year to the club, Ten Cate built Panathinaikos to play an attacking style of play based on possession in 4–2–3–1 and 4–3–2–1 formations, and they scored the most goals in the league.

The Panathinaikos board kept Ten Cate in his position for a second year, in which the club managed to achieve its best start in the League since 1996, with 9 wins and 2 draws in 11 matches. However, the Greek club suddenly got worth of their financial situation because of the financial crisis in Greece and was revealed unpaid wages (€4 million) of Ten Cate. Afterwards, Ten Cate decided to step down as its manager on 8 December 2009.

Middle East and Asia
On 6 February 2010, it was announced that Ten Cate signed a 6-month contract with the UAE champions Al-Ahli Club (Dubai). Only one month later he quit Al-Ahli, after a 5–0 defeat against Al-Sadd.

In April 2010, Umm Salal hired the Dutch coach as a replacement of Gerard Gili. Ten Cate worked as a manager of Umm Salal until February 2011. 

On 5 January 2012, Ten Cate became the manager of Shandong Luneng Taishan in China. However, as Shandong Luneng Taishan spent most of the season struggling at the edge of relegation, ten Cate resigned on 6 September.

On 4 April 2013, he shortly replaced the sacked Michel Vonk as manager of Sparta Rotterdam on a contract running until the end of the season. He returned to the Middle East in December 2015 after signing for UAE club Al Jazira, with whom he won the domestic league title in his second (and first full) season.

In April 2017, he was reportedly offered the job of managing of the Dutch national team, only for him to back out after it appeared the Dutch FA suddenly preferred to give the job to Dick Advocaat. At the same time, Ten Cate was subject to a legal investigation into certain business interests.

He left Al Jazira in May 2018.

On 4 November 2019, ten Cate was announced as Al-Ittihad's manager. He signed a contract which is due to keep him at Al-Ittihad until the end of the 2019–20 season, but with a possibility to extend the contract at the end of the season. However, he was dismissed on 11 February 2020 after a defeat against Damac.

In March 2021, ten Cate returned to Abu Dhabi to manage Al Wahda again. He would get sacked in October after a disappointing start to the season.

Playing career statistics

Honours

Manager
MTK Budapest
 Magyar Kupa: 1999–2000

Ajax
 KNVB Cup: 2006–07
 Johan Cruijff Shield: 2006, 2007

Al Jazira
 UAE Pro League: 2016–17

References

External links

 Goal.com profile 

1954 births
Living people
Dutch sportspeople of Surinamese descent
Footballers from Amsterdam
Dutch footballers
Association football wingers
AVV De Volewijckers players
Go Ahead Eagles players
Edmonton Drillers (1979–1982) players
SC Telstar players
Heracles Almelo players
Eredivisie players
North American Soccer League (1968–1984) players
Eerste Divisie players
Dutch expatriate footballers
Dutch expatriate sportspeople in Canada
Expatriate soccer players in Canada
Dutch football managers
Go Ahead Eagles managers
Heracles Almelo managers
Sparta Rotterdam managers
SBV Vitesse managers
KFC Uerdingen 05 managers
MTK Budapest FC managers
NAC Breda managers
FC Barcelona non-playing staff
AFC Ajax managers
Chelsea F.C. non-playing staff
Panathinaikos F.C. managers
Al Ahli Club (Dubai) managers
Umm Salal SC managers
Shandong Taishan F.C. managers
Al Jazira Club managers
Al Wahda FC managers
Ittihad FC managers
Eerste Divisie managers
Eredivisie managers
2. Bundesliga managers
Nemzeti Bajnokság I managers
Super League Greece managers
UAE Pro League managers
Qatar Stars League managers
Chinese Super League managers
Saudi Professional League managers
Dutch expatriate football managers
Dutch expatriate sportspeople in Germany
Dutch expatriate sportspeople in Hungary
Dutch expatriate sportspeople in Spain
Dutch expatriate sportspeople in England
Dutch expatriate sportspeople in Greece
Dutch expatriate sportspeople in the United Arab Emirates
Dutch expatriate sportspeople in Qatar
Dutch expatriate sportspeople in China
Dutch expatriate sportspeople in Saudi Arabia
Expatriate football managers in Germany
Expatriate football managers in Hungary
Expatriate football managers in Greece
Expatriate football managers in the United Arab Emirates
Expatriate football managers in Qatar
Expatriate football managers in China
Expatriate football managers in Saudi Arabia